The murder of Jeanne Clery occurred in 1986 in Bethlehem, Pennsylvania at Lehigh University. Clery, who was a freshman at the time of her death, was raped and killed in her campus dormitory. Clery's parents, who believed the university had failed to share vital information with its students regarding campus safety, campaigned for legislative reform for several years following their daughter's death.

Their efforts resulted in the passage in 1990 of the Clery Act, a federal law requiring all universities and colleges receiving federal student financial aid programs to report crime statistics, alert campus of imminent dangers, and distribute an Annual Campus Security Report to current and prospective students and employees, or face fines.

Josoph Henry, another student, was convicted of murdering and raping Clery and was sentenced to death, but he later agreed to drop all appeals in exchange for life imprisonment without parole.

Assault, murder, and aftermath
On April 5, 1986, in the spring of her freshman year, Jeanne Clery was raped and murdered in Stoughton Hall at Lehigh University by Josoph M. Henry, who was also a student. Clery was awakened by Henry while he was in the process of burglarizing her room. He then beat, cut, raped, sodomized, and strangled her. Prior to Clery's death, there were reports that her dorm had 181 situations of auto-locking doors being propped open by residents. Henry is believed to have gained access to Clery's room through the propped doors, as well as her own room door having been left unlocked for her roommate, who forgot her key.

He was reported to the police after confessing the murder to his friends and was subsequently apprehended. He was later sentenced to death via the electric chair, a decision upheld by the Supreme Court of Pennsylvania upon appeal. In 2002, after his death sentence was thrown out, Henry opted to give up his appeal rights and accepted life in prison rather than face another death penalty hearing with the possibility of a reinstated death sentence. He is currently serving his sentence at State Correctional Institution – Dallas.

Campaign by the Clerys
As Connie and Howard Clery learned more about their daughter's death, they grew convinced that she had died because of "slipshod" security on campus. Beyond this, they believed the university had "a rapidly escalating crime rate, which they didn't tell anybody about". At the time, Lehigh University's vice president, John Smeaton, said that security measures were "more than adequate, reasonable and appropriate for our setting and our situation. You can't prevent everything from happening." Nonetheless, the Clery family believed that campus crime statistics had been significantly underreported, and her parents founded the nonprofit organization Security On Campus, Inc., later renamed the Clery Center for Security On Campus.

Clery Act

Enactment
The Clery Act, signed in 1990, was originally known as the Crime Awareness and Campus Security Act.

Requirements
The Clery Act requires all colleges and universities that participate in federal financial aid programs to keep and disclose information about crime on and near their respective campuses. Compliance is monitored by the United States Department of Education, which can impose civil penalties, up to $56,906 per violation, against institutions for each infraction and can suspend institutions from participating in federal student financial aid programs.

Each year, institutions must publish and distribute their Annual Campus Security Report to current and prospective students and employees. This report is required to provide crime statistics for the prior three years, policy statements regarding various safety and security measures, campus crime prevention program descriptions, and procedures to be followed in the investigation and prosecution of alleged sex offenses.

Beyond this, universities are required to provide a crime log, timely warnings to students, and crime statistics. The institution's police department or security departments are required to maintain a public log of all crimes reported to them, or those of which they are made aware. The Clery Act requires institutions to give timely warnings of crimes that represent a threat to the safety of students or employees. Institutions are required to report on crimes such as: murder, rape, dating violence, robbery,  and hate crimes, as well as any disciplinary actions by the institution.

Violations
Since its founding, major incidents for which universities were found in violation of the Clery Act include Eastern Michigan University and the Murder of Laura Dickinson, the Penn State sex abuse scandal, and the Virginia Tech shooting.

See also
 Crime mapping
 Disappearance of Suzanne Lyall, SUNY Albany sophomore whose parents worked for state and federal laws named after her
 Duty to warn
 Family Educational Rights and Privacy Act
 Murder of Yeardley Love, University of Virginia lacrosse player killed by an ex-boyfriend on campus

References

External links
 Clery Center for Security On Campus, Inc.

1966 births
1986 in Pennsylvania
1986 deaths
1986 murders in the United States
Burials in Pennsylvania
Deaths by person in Pennsylvania
Deaths by strangulation in the United States
People murdered in Pennsylvania
Crimes in Pennsylvania
Law enforcement in the United States
Lehigh University
Rapes in the United States
Bethlehem, Pennsylvania
Murdered American students
Incidents of violence against women
Female murder victims
History of women in Pennsylvania